David Platt is an American film and television director. He has directed many episodes of Law & Order and its spin-off Law & Order: Special Victims Unit, as well as an episode of The Wire.
For The Wire Platt directed the fifth episode of the fourth season, "Alliances". Show runner David Simon praised Platt's deft touch with the young actors and the scene where the boys discover a corpse in a vacant house.  He has a house in Pennsylvania, and is friends with independent filmmaker/producer Carlton J. Albright.

Filmography
 Body of Proof
 Episode 8: "Buried Secrets".
House
Law & Order: Special Victims Unit
The Wire
Episode 4.05 "Alliances" (2006)
Law & Order
Law & Order: Trial by Jury
Queens Supreme (2003)
Law & Order: Criminal Intent
Hack (2002)
Judging Amy
The Education of Max Bickford (2001)
The Agency (2001)
Deadline (2000)
NYC 22 (2012)
Lie to Me S03E04

References

External links
 

Living people
Place of birth missing (living people)
Year of birth missing (living people)
American television directors